Purpura bufo is a species of sea snail, a marine gastropod mollusc in the family Muricidae, the murex snails or rock snails.

Description
Fully adult shells can attain 60+ mm. in size.

Distribution
Purpura bufo is a tropical species found in the Indian Ocean along the KwaZulu-Natal coast and Madagascar.

References

Purpura (gastropod)
Gastropods described in 1822